Lesbian, gay, bisexual, transgender (LGBT) persons in Burundi face legal challenges not experienced by non-LGBT citizens. While never criminalized before 2009, today Burundi criminalises same-sex sexual activity by both men and women, with a penalty up to two years in prison and a fine. LGBT persons are regularly prosecuted by the government and additionally face stigmatisation among the broader population.

Legality of same-sex sexual activity

According to an unofficial English translation of Article 567 of the Burundi Penal Code, a person who has sexual relations with someone of the same sex may be punished with imprisonment for three months to two years and a fine of 50,000 to 100,000 francs.

On 1 July 2009, a young man was arrested for allegedly committing sexual violence against a club patron in Bujumbura. The police later stated the man was arrested for being gay but offered to release the suspect in exchange for money. Advocacy by human rights NGOs and the LGBT community helped secure his release from police custody. In 2012, two lesbians were briefly arrested and subsequently released. In September 2014, a Vietnamese employee of the telephone company Viettel was caught in sexual relations with a Burundian man in Karuzi Province.  The Burundian man alleged that it was non-consensual sex, and the Vietnamese man was detained.  Authorities dropped the case after three days for lack of evidence. On 2 November 2016, the High Court of Cibitoke Province sentenced a 15-year-old boy who admitted to the rape of a seven-year-old boy to one year in prison. The adolescent was charged with rape of a minor and homosexuality.

Recognition of same-sex relationships

Burundi does not recognise same-sex marriage and civil unions. Article 29 of the Burundi Constitution bans same-sex marriage.

Adoption and family planning

According to a website of the French government, single and married people are eligible to adopt children. The website does not say whether single LGBT people are disqualified or not.

Living conditions

The U.S. Department of State's Country Reports on Human Rights Practices for 2016 stated that:

Acts of Violence, Discrimination, and Other Abuses Based on Sexual Orientation and Gender IdentityThe law criminalizes same-sex sexual acts with penalties ranging from fines to imprisonment of three months to two years. According to Burundi Africa Generation News, on 2 November, the High Court of Cibitoke Province sentenced a 15-year-old boy who admitted to the rape of a seven-year-old boy to one year in prison. The adolescent was charged with rape of a minor and homosexuality. There were no other reports of prosecution for homosexuality during the year. The Remuruka Center in Bujumbura offered urgent services to the LGBTI community. The government neither supported nor hindered the activities of local LGBTI organizations or the center.

Summary table

See also

Human rights in Burundi
LGBT rights in Africa

Notes

References

External links
International Gay and Lesbian Human Rights Commission – Burundi information

LGBT rights
Burundi
Human rights in Burundi
Politics of Burundi
LGBT in Burundi